This is a list of electoral division results for the 2019 Australian federal election in the state of Western Australia.

Overall results

Results by division

Brand

Burt

Canning

Cowan

Curtin

Durack

Forrest

Fremantle

Hasluck

Moore

O'Connor

Pearce

Perth

Stirling

Swan

Tangney

References

2019 Australian federal election
Western Australia 2019